Gus Borgeest (born 1 October 1909, Ningbo, China) was the founder of a camp for refugees from mainland China on Sunshine Island, Hong Kong. He was also winner of the Ramon Magsaysay Award in 1961.

A refugee from Shanghai, he went to Hong Kong in 1951 with his Chinese wife Mona with two Hong Kong dollars in their pocket.

See also
List of Ramon Magsaysay Award winners

References

1909 births
Year of death missing
Chinese emigrants to British Hong Kong